Józefów nad Wisłą is a small town in Opole Lubelskie County, Lublin Voivodeship, in eastern Poland. It is the seat of the gmina (administrative district) called Gmina Józefów nad Wisłą.

Józefów nad Wisłą lies on the Vistula river.

The town has a population of 1,023, and in 1687–1870 it had a status of a town, regained in 2018.

Twin towns
Józefów nad Wisłą is twinned with:

  Auce, Latvia
  Hollóháza, Hungary
  Tryńcza, Poland

Gallery

References

Cities and towns in Lublin Voivodeship
Lesser Poland
Lublin Governorate
Lublin Voivodeship (1919–1939)